Imeni Poliny Osipenko is a rural locality (a selo) and the administrative center of imeni Poliny Osipenko District of Khabarovsk Krai, Russia. Population:

History
Originally known as Kerbi, it was renamed in 1939 after Polina Osipenko, a Soviet pilot who set the women's world aircraft distance record flying to this location from Moscow.

Geography
It is located on the right bank of the Amgun River, near the confluence of the Nimelen.

Climate
Imeni Poliny Osipenko has a humid continental climate (Köppen climate classification Dwb), closely bordering on a subarctic climate (Dwc) with dry, severely cold winters and warm, moist summers. As far as non-arid climates warmer than subarctic climates go, Imeni Poliny Osipenko is among the coldest. Its lower latitude and inland location enables four months to just exceed . Winters are far colder than even many polar climates in maritime areas.

Transportation
A local road leads west to Briakan and then to Beryozovy, which is on the Baikal-Amur Mainline.

The settlement is served by Imeni Poliny Osipenko Airport.

References

Rural localities in Khabarovsk Krai